Tüvdiin Tserendondov (1 May 1934 – 15 April 2018) was a Mongolian sports shooter. He competed in the 50 metre rifle, three positions event at the 1964 Summer Olympics.

References

External links
 

1934 births
2018 deaths
Mongolian male sport shooters
Olympic shooters of Mongolia
Shooters at the 1964 Summer Olympics
People from Övörkhangai Province
20th-century Mongolian people